Lazy River is a 1934 American pre-Code drama film directed by George B. Seitz and starring Jean Parker and Robert Young.

Plot

Cast
 Jean Parker as Sarah Lescalle
 Robert Young as William 'Bill' Drexel
 Ted Healy as William 'Gabby' Stone
 Nat Pendleton as Alfred 'Tiny' Smith
 C. Henry Gordon as Sam Kee
 Ruth Channing as Ruby Drexel
 Maude Eburne as Miss Minnie Lescalle
 Raymond Hatton as Capt. Herbert Orkney
 Irene Franklin as Suzanne
 Joseph Cawthorn as Mr. Julius Ambrose
 Erville Alderson as Sheriff
 George J. Lewis as Armand Lescalle (as George Lewis)

References

External links

1934 films
1934 drama films
Films directed by George B. Seitz
American black-and-white films
Metro-Goldwyn-Mayer films
American drama films
1930s American films
1930s English-language films